Yadav Kharel (Nepali: यादव खरेल ; born 23 February 1943) is a Nepali film director, producer and writer. Being one of the most acclaimed directors in Nepali Film Industry, Kharel was the founding chairperson of Film Development Board, Nepal (2000 - 2002).

Kharel, a veteran director and academician, is one of the first filmmakers to earn a diploma in movie direction and production. He started his career in media as a program host in Radio Nepal and became involved in film direction later.

References 

1943 births
Living people
Nepalese film directors
21st-century Nepalese screenwriters
21st-century Nepalese film directors
20th-century Nepalese film directors